Mohammad Shahlu (also Romanized as Moḩammad Shāhlū; also known as Moḩammadlū, Moḩammad Şāleḩ, Moḩammad Shālū, and Muhammad Sālih) is a village in Shivanat Rural District, Afshar District, Khodabandeh County, Zanjan Province, Iran. At the 2006 census, its population was 101, in 31 families.

References 

Populated places in Khodabandeh County